Lycium californicum is a spreading shrub in the nightshade family known by the common names California boxthorn and California desert-thorn.

This plant, as Lycium californicum var. californicum, is native to the Coastal sage scrub and coastal bluffs along the coast of Southern California to northern Baja California and the northern and southern Channel Islands. As Lycium californicum var. arizonicum it is found in the Sonoran Desert in southern Arizona.

Description
This thorny shrub, with rigid-spreading branches. has thick, fleshy, bulbous  green leaves. The widely triangular bell-shaped white flowers have purple streaks or spots. It bears bright red shiny berries  in diameter, and oblong seeds.

Varieties

L. c. var. californicum 
The shrub variety Lycium californicum var. californicum is a member of the chaparral ecosystem and other plant communities of the direct coastline from Santa Barbara County south into Baja California, below 150 m. It is most plentiful in the ecotone between salt marshes-estuaries and the coastal sage scrub plant community. The destruction of this specific ecotone in this highly developed region has led to a reduction in the population of this plant there. It extends into the Inland Empire floodplains.

L. c. var. arizonicum 
Another variety, Lycium californicum var. arizonicum, is found in riparian Arroyos in the Yuma Desert, Tule Desert, and greater Sonoran Desert across southern Arizona.

See also
Boxthorn — Lycium
California coastal sage and chaparral- (subecoregion)
Coastal sage scrub — (plant association)

References

Further reading

External links
 Calflora Database: Lycium californicum (California box thorn, California desert thorn)
Jepson Manual eFlora (TJM2) treatment of Lycium californicum
USDA Plants Profile: Lycium californicum (California desert-thorn)
USDA Plants Profile: Lycium californicum var. arizonicum (desert-thorn)
UC Photos gallery — Lycium californicum

californicum
Flora of California
Flora of Arizona
Flora of Baja California
Natural history of the California chaparral and woodlands
Natural history of the Channel Islands of California
Natural history of the Peninsular Ranges
Plants described in 1876
Flora without expected TNC conservation status